The Watcher is a 2016 American horror film directed by Ryan Rothmaier and starring Erin Cahill and Edi Gathegi. The film follows a young couple who after moving into a new home find themselves being terrorized to leave. The film is inspired by the real case of the 657 Boulevard (in Westfield, New Jersey) "Watcher", who sent threatening letters to the homeowners.

Plot
In an attempt to make a new start, young couple Emma (Erin Cahill) and Noah (Edi Gathegi) move to Los Angeles after purchasing a house where the previous tenant died. While moving in Emma and Noah meet neighbors Jeanne (Denise Crosby) and her mentally disabled son Mikey (Riley Baron) as well as the couple across the street, Reggie (Kevin Daniels) and Amanda (Tracie Thoms), with whom they become friends. Soon Emma and Noah begin to receive threatening letters from a mysterious figure calling themselves "The Raven", demanding they leave the house. Emma begins seeing hallucinations.

Cast
Erin Cahill as Emma
Edi Gathegi as Noah
Denise Crosby as Jeanne
Riley Baron as Mikey
Kevin Daniels as Reggie
Tracie Thoms as Amanda

References

External links
 
 

2016 films
2016 horror films
American horror films
Horror films based on actual events
2010s English-language films
2010s American films